Marinobacterium jannaschii is a Gram-negative bacterium. The cells are straight rods. It was isolated from seawater.

References 
Garrity, George M. (2005). Bergey's manual of systematic bacteriology, Volume Two: The Proteobacteria, Part B: The Gammaproteobacteria. New York: Springer

External links
Type strain of Marinobacterium jannaschii at BacDive -  the Bacterial Diversity Metadatabase

Alteromonadales
Bacteria described in 2002